Cresera optima is a moth of the family Erebidae first described by Arthur Gardiner Butler in 1877. It is found in French Guiana, Guyana, Amazonas, Ecuador and Colombia.

References

Moths described in 1877
Phaegopterina